Demon is a multi-looping roller coaster at Six Flags Great America in Gurnee, Illinois and California's Great America in Santa Clara, California. Both coasters opened in 1976 as Turn of the Century, when each Great America park was owned by Marriott Corporation. Following the 1979 season, they were slightly modified and renamed Demon, which introduced a new theme.

History
The Turn of the Century coasters opened with both Marriott's Great America parks in 1976 and were designed by Arrow Dynamics. Both were painted light seafoam green and were among some of the first roller coasters to feature a double corkscrew. They also featured two airtime hills after the first drop. The hills were well known for ejecting loose articles from the trains, such as hats, sunglasses and stuffed animals. The ride was custom-built for both parks.

After the 1979 season, Turn of the Century was heavily modified. The airtime hills after the first drop were removed and replaced with two back to back vertical loops and a lighted tunnel. Fake rock formations were built around the second loop and around the first half of the lift hill, with a third formation just before the corkscrews. The entire ride was painted black and was renamed Demon. In addition to the re-design, the theme was changed as well. Fog machines were placed in the tunnels, blood red colored water fell out of the rock formation by the corkscrews and a unique logo was unveiled. The original trains were also modified. A three-dimensional logo was attached to the front car of each train and flames were painted on the sides of the cars. After the loops were added, it became the second four-inversion roller coaster, after the Carolina Cyclone at Carowinds which opened two months earlier.
 
The storyline of the ride's transformation heard in the Demon soundtrack is that the park accidentally missed three payments on the roller coaster, and that a demon has repossessed the ride.

Six Flags Great America theming
For a period in the 80s, the Demon at both Great America parks was branded with the Looney Tunes Tasmanian Devil character.

Most of the theming elements that would be removed by 1990 including the drain pipe on the sign, 3D logos and flames on the trains, smoke and lighting effects, and the ride's soundtrack. Another major change made to the ride's theming was the lighted tunnel after the loops. The original lighting effect was a swirl around the train as it flew by.  

For Six Flags Great America's Fright Fest event, in 2005, almost all of Demon's original theming returned. Decals similar to the original logos were added to the noses of the trains, fog returned in the tunnels, the Demon Song played in the queue again, red lights shined around the ride, and tiki torches were placed all around the ride.

A re-creation of the original sign was present at Fright Fest. Built from an oil barrel with red lights and fog, it was placed in the flower bed in front of the ride's sign.

On the parks's 2006 opening day, the Demon song continued playing in the queue, the decals were still on the front of the trains, and the flames were still painted on the station. The rest of the theming is for Fright Fest Only.

For 2007, the Demon logos on the front of the trains were updated. The decals of the original Marriott-era logo were replaced with new airbrushed logos similar to the originals. The updated logos feature meaner-looking demon eyes, flames, and on the yellow train, fangs. In June 2007, the red train was placed back on the track after an extensive rehab beginning late in the 2005 season.

Also in June 2007, the Demon sign received new airbrush-painted flames on the DEMON letters, and the flowers in front of the sign were re-arranged to look like flames. In July 2007, all of the signs in the queue were repainted to look more themed to the ride. New fencing was also built around the Demon sign hill to prevent young guests from climbing on the sign. In 2008, all theming returned from the previous year's Fright Fest and fog was put in every tunnel and in the queue. However, grey paint replaced the flames on the outside of the operator's booth. After Memorial Day 2010, Demon's black train was put back on track. It was given airbrushed flames on the sides of the front car with no red stripe.

For a 2010 advertising deal with Six Flags, the red train was wrapped in Stride Gum advertisements for the entire season. The "Stride Train" remained for most of the 2011 operating season, but the advertisements were removed in late August.

In 2011, the yellow train's logo was redesigned to more closely resemble the original.

In late 2016, the attraction was given a virtual reality (VR) upgrade. The experience would be called Rage of the Gargoyles. Riders had the option to wear Samsung Gear VR headsets, powered by Oculus to create a 360-degree, 3D experience while riding. The illusion was themed to a fighter jet, where riders flew through a futuristic city as co-pilots battling demonic creatures.

Incidents

In 1993, two trains collided at low speeds in the station of the Six Flags Great America ride causing eight people to be injured.

A major incident on the Six Flags Great America version of Demon occurred on Saturday, April 18, 1998. Twenty-three riders were left stranded upside-down after the black train came to an unexpected halt in the middle of one of the vertical loops. Firefighters used a cherry picker to bring the passengers to safety. Some riders were stuck for nearly three hours. Three passengers were taken to local hospitals out of precaution but released that afternoon. Investigators concluded that the incident was caused by mechanical failure. A guide wheel that runs along the inside of the track separated from the axle of the last car. A mechanical safety system built into the wheel assembly engaged, preventing the train from derailing. The roller coaster reopened shortly after the conclusion of the investigation.

Operations
Today both Demons continue to operate, although they are not as popular as they once were. Demon operates with 2-3 trains, determined by the park's attendance. Demon at Six Flags Great America is much like its twin at California's Great America, but the California version lacks rocks around the second loop; however, it still has the waterfall by the corkscrews but the water is not red. The Illinois version still has the rock formation.

References

External links
 Demon at California's Great America (official)
 Demon at Six Flags Great America (official)

California's Great America
Roller coasters in Illinois
Roller coasters in California
Roller coasters introduced in 1976
Roller coasters operated by Cedar Fair
Roller coasters operated by Six Flags
Six Flags Great America

de:Demon (California’s Great America)
fr:Demon (California's Great America)